Zizia aptera is a flowering plant native to North America. Its common names include meadow zizia, golden alexanders, heart leaved golden alexanders, and prairie golden alexanders.

Description
Compound umbels of yellow flowers bloom atop the stems from May to July. The fruits are elliptical.

Distribution and habitat
Zizia aptera can be found throughout southern Canada and much of the continental United States, though it is absent in the Southwest, the southern Great Plains, and New England. It inhabits wet areas.

Conservation
Zizia aptera is listed as endangered in Connecticut, as rare in Indiana, as threatened in Michigan, and as "historical" (extirpated) in Rhode Island.

References

aptera
Flora of North America